Souma may refer to:

 Soumâa, Boumerdès, a village in Boumerdès Province, Algeria
 Soumâa, Blida, a town in Blida Province, Algeria
 Soma (drink), a Vedic ritual ambrosia drink

See also
 Soumya, an Indian given name
 Sōma (disambiguation)
 Soma (disambiguation)